The 5th Separate Assault Regiment is a is a mechanized assault regiment that was formed on May 10, 2022 as a response to the ongoing Russian invasion of Ukraine.

History 
The 5th Assault Regiment was founded by Pavlo Palisa. The regiment is closely affiliated with the 58th Motorized Brigade, as Palisa previously served in the brigade and was originally slated to become its deputy commander. Under the command of Colonel Palisa, the 5th Assault Regiment is part of the Operational Command North.

In October 2022, the regiment was called to action in the Battle of Bakhmut, where it fought alongside Ukrainian naval infantry and national guard forces.

The young regiment was upgraded to a brigade in early 2023.

Structure 
As of 2023 the brigade's structure is as follows:

 5th Separate Assault Brigade, N/A
 Brigade Headquarters and HQ Company
 1st Infantry Battalion (Mechanized)
 2nd Infantry Battalion (Mechanized)
 3rd Infantry Battalion (Mechanized)
 Tank Battalion
 Field Artillery Battalion
 Anti-air Defense Artillery Battalion

References 

2022 establishments in Ukraine
Regiments of Ukraine
Military units and formations established in 2022